James M. Acton is a British academic and scientist. He is co-director of the Nuclear Policy Program at the Carnegie Endowment for International Peace.

Early life
Acton was awarded his PhD in theoretical physics at Cambridge University.

Career 
Acton was a member of the faculty of the Department of War Studies at King's College, London.

Acton's research projects have included analyses of IAEA safeguards in Iran, verifying disarmament in North Korea and preventing novel forms of radiological terrorism.

Fukushima
In the context of the Fukushima I nuclear accidents, Acton was able to distill a succinct analysis which was widely reported. 
 "Fukushima is not the worst nuclear accident ever but it is the most complicated and the most dramatic...This was a crisis that played out in real time on TV. Chernobyl did not."
 "The key question is whether we have correctly predicted the risk that a reactor could be hit by a disaster (natural or man-made) that is bigger than it is designed to withstand."

Selected works
In a statistical overview derived from writings by and about James Acton, OCLC/WorldCat encompasses roughly 7 works in 10+ publications in 1 language and 268 library holdings.

 The Use of Voluntary Safeguards to Build Trust in States' Nuclear Programmes: the Case of Iran (2007)
 Beyond the Dirty Bomb: Re-thinking Radiological Terror (2007)
 Abolishing Nuclear Weapons (2008), with George Perkovich
 Abolishing Nuclear Weapons: A Debate (2009), with George Perkovich
 Deterrence During Disarmament: Deep Nuclear Reductions and International Security, and Low Numbers: A Practical Path to Deep Nuclear Reductions (2011)

Notes

Living people
British nuclear physicists
Date of birth missing (living people)
Academics of King's College London
Alumni of the University of Cambridge
Year of birth missing (living people)